Yellagonga (d. 1843) was a leader of the Whadjuk Noongar on the north side of the Swan River. Colonists saw Yellagonga as the owner of this area. However, land rights were also traced through women of the group. Yellagonga could hunt on wetlands north of Perth because of his wife Yingani's connections to that country.

In 1843 the settler press reported that "the mild, amiable Yella-gonga acknowledged by the natives as the possessor of vast tracts of land between Perth and Fremantle, is no more. He fell from a rock on the river's bank, and was drowned".

Heritage
Yellagonga Regional Park, around Lake Joondalup, was named after him.

In 2018, Mia Yellagonga (Place of Yellagonga) was chosen as the name of the Woodside Energy Global Headquarters Campus bounded by Mounts Bay Road, Spring Street, and Mount Street (the former Emu Brewery site) in the Perth central business district.

References

Noongar people
People from Perth, Western Australia
1843 deaths